True Faith and Allegiance (stylized as Tom Clancy True Faith and Allegiance, Tom Clancy: True Faith and Allegiance, or Tom Clancy's True Faith and Allegiance in the United Kingdom) is a political thriller, written by Mark Greaney and released on December 6, 2016. In the book, President Jack Ryan and The Campus must contain a massive intelligence breach that has been responsible for a series of terrorist attacks on American military and intelligence personnel. True Faith and Allegiance is Greaney's last book in the Jack Ryan series, which is part of the Tom Clancy universe. It debuted at number three on the New York Times bestseller list.

Plot
Romanian hacker Alexandru Dalca obtains an old copy of the e-QIP database, which contains personal information on millions of U.S. military and intelligence personnel. The Chinese originally hire him to use the stolen information in order to locate U.S. spies in their country. However, Dalca uses this treasure trove of information to make a profit by building targeting packages on specific individuals. This attracts the attention of Saudi technocrat Sami bin Rashid, who wanted to provoke the United States into a quagmire in the Middle East fighting ISIS, which would then recoup the loss of profit in Saudi oil.

After making contact with Dalca through the dark web, Bin Rashid meets with ISIS operative Abu Musa al Matari and formulates a plan to attack U.S. military and intelligence personnel, using the targeting packages compiled by Dalca himself, in order to further his plan. Al Matari then recruits cleanskins and assigns them into cells to carry out the attacks. The video recordings of the assaults are then uploaded to the Islamic State's propaganda site, promoting the terror organization, garnering new followers, and inspiring a series of copycat attacks.

The intelligence community quickly becomes concerned about the wave of attacks on U.S. intelligence and military personnel, and scramble to find the source. President Jack Ryan is then pressured by the media and elements in his own government to deploy troops into the Middle East to battle the Islamic State, but persistently refuses to do so by gathering intelligence, knowing that Islamic State is provoking him.

Meanwhile The Campus, currently understaffed, recruits two new members: previously director of transportation Adara Sherman and ex-Delta Force operator Bartosz “Midas” Jankowski. They also investigate the attacks, and later deduce that the e-QIP database may have been compromised. Jack Ryan Jr. looks into a particular, seemingly unrelated attack on Scott Hagen, who is the commander of the guided missile destroyer USS James Greer, from the brother of a Russian submarine crew killed by Hagen in a recent battle in the Baltic Sea (depicted in Commander in Chief). After looking into the assailant's social media, he finds out that Dalca provided information on Hagen prior to the attack. With this information on hand, The Campus heads to Romania.

In the meantime, the Chinese get suspicious about Dalca not following their orders. The hacker assumes the same thing, and when the Chinese come looking for him in his place of work, he escapes, intending to leave Romania. The Campus, who are surveilling the Romanian nearby, joins in the chase and get involved in a shootout with the Chinese, killing them, but Dalca is nowhere to be found. The Campus later finds out about Dalca's plans to leave the country, and abduct him at an airport. He decides to cooperate in stopping al Matari; Ryan Jr presents himself as a target, staying in an isolated cabin in a Maryland forest. Simultaneously, Olivia "Sally" Ryan accepts an engagement proposal from her Turkish boyfriend Dr. Davi Kartal. Al Matari takes the bait and is easily captured, while the rest of his henchmen are killed in the ensuing firefight, with Davi injuring the ringleader.

The headquarters of the Islamic State's propaganda wing was later destroyed in an airstrike. The U.S. betrays Dalca to Chinese security agents, but his fate is left unknown. Meanwhile, Bin Rashid was killed by The Campus in a plane headed for Australia.

Characters

United States government
 Jack Ryan: President of the United States
 Scott Adler: Secretary of state
 Mary Pat Foley: Director of national intelligence
 Robert Burgess: Secretary of defense
 Jay Canfield: Director of the Central Intelligence Agency
 Dan Murray: Attorney general
 Andrew Zilko: Secretary of homeland security
 Arnold van Damm: President Ryan's chief of staff
 Stuart Collier: CIA operations officer
 Benjamin Kincaid: United States Department of State consular official
 Barbara Pineda: Analyst, Defense Intelligence Agency
 Jennifer Kincaid: CIA operations officer
 Thomas Russell: Assistant special agent in charge, director of Joint Terrorism Task Force
 David Jeffcoat: Supervisory special agent, Federal Bureau of Investigation

U.S. military
 Carrie Ann Davenport: Captain, United States Army; copilot/gunner of AH-64E Apache
 Troy Oakley: Chief warrant officer 3, United States Army; pilot of AH-64E Apache
 Scott Hagen: Commander, United States Navy; captain of USS James Greer (DDG-102)
 Wendell Caldwell: General, United States Army; commanding officer of United States Central Command

The Campus
 Gerry Hendley: Director of The Campus and Hendley Associates
 John Clark: Director of operations
 Domingo “Ding” Chavez: Senior operations officer
 Dominic “Dom” Caruso: Operations officer
 Jack Ryan, Jr.: Operations officer / senior analyst
 Gavin Biery: Director of information technology
 Adara Sherman: Director of transportation
 Bartosz Jankowski: Lieutenant colonel (Ret.), U.S. Army; call sign “Midas”; ex-Delta Force operator
 Helen Reid: Pilot of Campus Gulfstream G550
 Chester “Country” Hicks: Copilot of Campus Gulfstream G550

Other characters
 Dr. Cathy Ryan: First Lady of the United States
 Dr. Olivia “Sally” Ryan: Daughter of President Jack Ryan
Dr. Davi Kartal: Turkish doctor and fiancé of Olivia Ryan 
 Xozan Barzani: Kurdish Peshmerga commander
 Sami bin Rashid: Security official, Gulf Cooperation Council
 Abu Musa al-Matari: Yemeni national / Islamic State operative
 Vadim Rechkov: Russian citizen in U.S. on a student visa
 Dragomir Vasilescu: Director of Advanced Research Technological Designs (ARTD)
 Alexandru Dalca: Researcher for ARTD; open-source investigations expert
 Luca Gabor: Romanian prison inmate; identity intelligence expert
 Edward Laird: Former CIA executive; intelligence community contractor
 “Algiers”: Algerian ISIS operative
 Tripoli: Libyan ISIS operative
 Rakim: Leader of ISIS cell “Chicago”
 Omar: Leader of ISIS cell “Detroit”
 Angela Watson: Leader of ISIS cell “Atlanta”
 Kateb Albaf: Leader of ISIS cell “Santa Clara”
 David Hembrick: Leader of ISIS cell “Fairfax”

Reception

Commercial
True Faith and Allegiance debuted at number three at the Combined Print & E-Book Fiction and Hardcover Fiction categories of the New York Times bestseller list for the week of December 25, 2016. In addition, it debuted at number nine on the USA Today Best Selling Books list for the week of December 15, 2016.

Critical
The book received generally positive reviews. Associated Press praised Greaney, who "handles the tech side with grace and has fleshed out the cast and given them depth." In a featured review, thriller novel reviewer The Real Book Spy praised the novel as "a fantastic, timely political thriller that has everything fans of the genre are looking for" and concluded that it is "A must-read for anyone who considers themselves a fan of thrillers."

References

2016 American novels
American thriller novels
Techno-thriller novels
Ryanverse
Novels set in Romania
G. P. Putnam's Sons books